Androcles and the Lion is a 1967 American TV film. It is a musical adaptation of the George Bernard Shaw play Androcles and the Lion.

It was adapted by Peter Stone and directed by Joe Layton. The songs were by Richard Rodgers.

Plot
Androcles, a simple-hearted Christian tailor, becomes friends with a lion by removing a thorn from  his paw. Later the lion saves Androcles and his friends from martyrdom in the Roman Colosseum.

Cast
Norman Wisdom as Androcles
Inga Swenson as Lavinia
Noël Coward as Caesar
Ed Ames as Ferrovius
Geoffrey Holder as Lion
John Cullum as The Captain
Brian Bedford as Lentulus
Patricia Routledge as Magaera
William Redfield as Metellus

Production
Stone said "It is amazing how many opportunities the play offers for musical comedy. I have added no new scenes although there are certain expansions to allow for musicalization. And I have not created any new characters. Shaw, who wrote the play 52 years ago, used contemporary language. There are no anachronisms and the jokes he used were modern.""

The Shaw estate had to approve any changes to the text.

Reception
The Los Angeles Times called it "toothless". The New York Times said it "took unhappy toll of varied talents" and "wavered diconcertingly in its indecision over whether to be serious or to have fun" with a "lack of light touch in the staging".

Songs
"Velvet Paws" – Norman Wisdom
"Follow in Our Footsteps" - Ed Ames and Chorus
"Strangers"  – Inga Swenson and John Cullum
"Strength Is My Weakness" – Norman Wisdom and Ed Ames 
"The Emperor's Thumb" – Noël Coward
"No More Waiting" – Inga Swenson and John Cullum
"The Arena Pantomime" – Norman Wisdom and Orchestra
"Don't Be Afraid Of An Animal" – Noël Coward and Norman Wisdom

References

External links
Androcles and the Lion at IMDb
Androcles and his Lion at TCMDB

1967 films
American television films